is a Japanese athlete. She competed in the women's marathon event at the 2019 World Athletics Championships held in Doha, Qatar. She finished in 11th place. She also competed in the 2017 Tokyo Marathon and the 2018 Tokyo Marathon held in Tokyo, Japan.

References

External links
 

1991 births
Living people
Japanese female long-distance runners
Japanese female marathon runners
Place of birth missing (living people)
World Athletics Championships athletes for Japan
20th-century Japanese women
21st-century Japanese women